The South Florida Times is a weekly newspaper covering the Black community in Miami-Dade, Broward, and Palm Beach counties in the southern part of the U.S. state of Florida. It publishes on Fridays, with a circulation of about 35,000. Robert G. Beatty acquired the paper, then known as the Broward Times, in 2007; the name was changed several months later, along with plans to expand to neighboring counties. Beatty had a background as legal counsel to the Miami Herald, and has been a featured speaker at local business functions. Bradley Bennett, who served as executive editor, also had a background with the Herald. The paper's stated mission includes in-depth analysis of worldwide events relating to the African diaspora, and making connections to its local community. The paper has partnered with the Miami Herald. The Times''' reporting has been picked up by the Herald,Jones, Elgin. "Board's closure creates controversy." The Miami Herald, 17 May 2009, p. 243. and has been referenced in the Herald's own reporting.Jackson, Barry. "Roster moves mean Carpenter ready." The Miami Herald, 1 December 2011, p. D3. As of 2010, a journalism professor at the Florida International University partnered with the Times, assigning his students to investigate and report stories for the paper.

Keith Clayborne founded the Broward Times in 1990. It was seen as the voice of younger, educated, "up-and-coming" voices in the local Black community, largely from the Caribbean, as opposed to the older veterans of the civil rights era. In 2000 the paper formed an editorial partnership with the Sun-Sentinel. Clayborne hired a new editor, Utrice Leid, in 2004, in an effort to take the paper "to the next level." At the time, the paper had a circulation of 24,000; hiring Leid reflected an effort to overcome a reputation for over-using unnamed sources. Clayborne, who did not have a background in journalism, had stepped away from his editing duties to run for political office. He was later sued for libel by his opponent, Alcee Hastings.

A publication called the South Florida Times, a monthly 4-color glossy magazine, was founded by Audrey S. Diamond, who was given a lifetime achievement award in 2003. (Unclear whether there is any relation between these publications.) There was also a Democratic publication of the same name in the late 19th century."A List of Newspapers and Magazines—Florida—Volusia Co." American Newspaper Catalogue, Edwin Alden & Bro., 1882, p. 321. There was also an earlier paper called the Broward Times'' in the 1980s.

References 

Newspapers published in Florida
African-American newspapers